Mikkeli Cathedral is a large church in Mikkeli, Southern Savonia, Finland, designed by Finnish church architect Josef Stenbäck. It was built in 1896–1897 and represents the Gothic Revival style like many other churches designed by Stenbäck.  The bell tower is in the western gable of the church.  The church has 1,200 seats.

The organ was built in 1956 by Kangasala Organ Factory and has 51 stops.  The altar painting "Crucified" was made by Pekka Halonen in 1899.

External links 

 Bells (.mp3)
 Organ's disposition and other information

Lutheran cathedrals in Finland
Cathedral
Gothic Revival church buildings in Finland
Buildings and structures in South Savo
Tourist attractions in South Savo